Adelaide Central School of Art is an independent, not-for-profit, accredited higher education provider of tertiary courses in the visual arts, located in Adelaide, Australia.  Adelaide Central School of Art uses the atelier model of visual arts education. The school offers an associate degree of Visual Art, Bachelor of Visual Art, and Bachelor of Visual Art (Hons), and short courses, workshops and masterclasses.

History
The School was founded in 1982 by Rod Taylor and Heather Nicholson. Initially occupying a rented space in Bloor Court, Adelaide, it moved in 1988 to a warehouse in Gilles Street, establishing itself as an accredited independent art school. In January 1994, the School moved to heritage buildings in Osmond Terrace, Norwood, leasing them from the School's founder until they were sold in 2011.  Taylor retired in 2008 and was succeeded by Ingrid Kellenbach as CEO. Adelaide Central School of Art relocated to the Glenside Cultural Precinct in January 2013, completing the first stage of the renovation of two iconic heritage buildings in May 2013.  The South Australian Government granted the School a 50-year lease on these buildings located adjacent to the Adelaide Film Studios home of the South Australian Film Corporation and related creative enterprises. The new Glenside Campus provides facilities in the three-story Teaching and Studio Building, including spaces for classes, integrated student studios, lecture room, media room, enlarged library facilities and display space for artwork on each level.

In September 2018, the School announced that Penny Griggs, Director of the SALA Festival, would succeed Ingrid Kellenbach as the School's CEO in November 2018.

Degree courses 
The degree courses are designed to develop technical and conceptual skills. The curriculum includes the disciplines of drawing, painting, sculpture, art history and theory and contemporary studies, for part-time or full-time study.

Campus 
The School is located on the Glenside campus in two heritage buildings that formed part of the Glenside Hospital. The buildings were renovated by Adelaide-based architects Grieve Gillett in consultation with the School and the renovation received an award from the Australian Institute of Architects for Heritage Architecture in 2014.

Adelaide Central Gallery 

The Adelaide Central Gallery was formally opened as part of the School in 1991. At threat of closure in 2002, a restructure in 2003 allowed the gallery to continue. The gallery has hosted two award-winning exhibitions: Façade received the 2018 Adelaide Fringe/BankSA Award for Best Visual Art & Design; and Home Stories received the 2011 Adelaide Fringe Eran Svigos Award for Best Visual Art & Design.

Rankings

In the Quality Indicators for Learning and Teaching survey for 2017, the school was ranked the best art school in Australia for 2017 (second-best in 2016).

Notable faculty 
 Roy Ananda
 Daryl Austin
 Daniel Connell
 Johnnie Dady
 Andrew Dearman
 James Dodd
 Nicholas Folland
 Zoe Freney
 Geoff Gibbons
 Sasha Grbich
 Rob Gutteridge
 Sue Kneebone
 Monte Masi
 John Neylon
 Christopher Orchard
 Julia Robinson (artist)
 Sera Waters

References

Arts in Adelaide
Australian vocational education and training providers
Art schools in Australia